2008 China Open can refer to:
2008 China Open (tennis), a tennis tournament
2008 China Open Super Series, a badminton tournament
China Open 2008 (snooker), a snooker tournament